Hot Country Songs is a chart that ranks the top-performing country music songs in the United States, published by Billboard magazine.  In 1987, 50 different songs topped the chart, then published under the title Hot Country Singles, in 52 issues of the magazine, based on playlists submitted by country music radio stations and sales reports submitted by stores.

At the start of the year, the song at the top of the charts was "Mind Your Own Business" by Hank Williams Jr.  The single had moved into the number one position in the issue of Billboard dated December 27, 1986 and remained in place for a second week in the issue dated January 3. The final number one of the year was "Somewhere Tonight" by Highway 101, which began a two-week run at the top in the issue dated December 26, 1987. Between those two chart-toppers, the only song to spend more than one week at number one was "Forever and Ever, Amen" by Randy Travis, which had a three-week run in the peak position during the summer. The song won both the Grammy Award for Best Country Song and the Academy of Country Music award for Song of the Year.

Seven artists each achieved three number ones in 1987: Reba McEntire, Dan Seals, Earl Thomas Conley, George Strait, Steve Wariner, the Judds, and Ronnie Milsap, one of whose chart-toppers was a collaboration with Kenny Rogers.  In addition to her three credited number ones, McEntire was also one of four featured vocalists on Hank Williams Jr's "Mind Your Own Business", none of whom were listed on the chart.  Acts to reach number one for the first time included S-K-O and the O'Kanes, both of whom topped the chart for the first and only time in 1987. Michael Johnson had two number ones in the first half of the year, the first of which, "Give Me Wings", was named by Billboard as the top country single of the year.  These would prove to be his only appearances at the top of the chart, however.  At the other end of the scale, Milsap took his count of Hot Country number ones past 30, as he continued a run of ten number ones achieved between 1985 and 1989. Only Merle Haggard (38), Conway Twitty (40) and George Strait (44) have taken more songs to the top of the Hot Country chart than Milsap since Billboard began compiling sales and airplay into a single listing in 1958. Other veteran acts to appear at the top of the chart in 1987 included the Oak Ridge Boys, who achieved their fourteenth and fifteenth number ones, but their last to feature vocalist William Lee Golden, who was expelled from the group after more than 20 years during 1987. Crystal Gayle, one of the most successful chart acts of the preceding ten years, reached number one for the eighteenth and final time with "Straight to the Heart".

Chart history

See also
1987 in music
List of artists who reached number one on the U.S. country chart

References

1987
1987 record charts
Country